Felicidade (English: Happiness) is a Brazilian telenovela produced and broadcast by TV Globo between October 7, 1991 and May 30, 1992. It was created by Manoel Carlos with the collaboration of Elizabeth Jhin and directed by Denise Saraceni, based on the tales of Aníbal Machado.

Cast

Special Participations

References

External links 
 

1991 telenovelas
Brazilian telenovelas
1991 Brazilian television series debuts
1992 Brazilian television series endings
TV Globo telenovelas
Portuguese-language telenovelas
Television shows set in Rio de Janeiro (city)